Darling Darling is a 2016 Tamil-language comedy soap opera starring Ramji, V. J. Chitra, Nalini, Sri Vidhya Shankar, Monkey Ravi, Vasanth Gopinath and Nandhini. The show premiered on 12 December 2016. The show is an adaptation of the &TV serial Bhabi Ji Ghar Par Hai! The show last aired on 10 June 2017 and ended with 102 episodes.

Cast
 Ramji as Venkatesh (Vicky)
 V. J. Chitra as Anitha (Honey, Vicky's wife)
 Vasanth Gopinath as Natarajan (Nattu)
 Nandhini as Rukkumani (Rukku, Nattu's wife)
 Sri Vidhya Shankar as Vicky's mother
 Nalini as Nattu's mother
 Monkey Ravi as Gopi

Soundtrack 
The album was released officially Diwali on 29 October 2016 at the Deepavali special program hosted by Deepak Dinkar.

Title: Darling Darling OST
Artist: Gana Bala
Language: Tamil
Release date: 29 October 2016
Number of tracks: 1
Publisher: Zee Music Company
Agency: Zee Music Company

Airing history 
The show started airing on Zee Tamil on 19 December 2016, and aired on Monday through Friday at 10:00PM (IST). Starting from Monday 24 April 2017, the show was shifted to every Saturday at 10:00PM (IST). A show named Solvathellam Unmai replaced this show at 10:00PM (IST).

References

External links
 

Zee Tamil original programming
Tamil-language comedy television series
Tamil-language romance television series
2016 Tamil-language television series debuts
Tamil-language television shows
2017 Tamil-language television series endings
Tamil-language television series based on Hindi-language television series
Television shows set in Tamil Nadu